George John Petrovich Jr. (March 22, 1926 – March 31, 2010) was an American football guard, tackle, and defensive tackle.

A native of Palestine, Texas, he played college football for the Texas Longhorns in 1943 and 1944. His athletic career was interrupted in February 1945 when he was inducted into the United States Army.  After his military service, he returned to Texas and played at the tackle position for the 1947 and 1948 Texas Longhorns football teams. He then played professional football in the National Football League (NFL) as a guard for the Chicago Cardinals during the 1949 and 1950 seasons. He appeared in a total of 22 NFL games.

References

1926 births
2010 deaths
Chicago Cardinals players
Texas Longhorns football players
Players of American football from Texas
United States Army personnel of World War II